The 75th Group Army ), formerly the 41st Group Army, is a military formation of the Chinese People's Liberation Army Ground Forces (PLAGF). The 75th Group Army is one of twelve total group armies of the PLAGF, the largest echelon of ground forces in the People's Republic of China, and one of two assigned to the nation's Southern Theater Command.

Organization

Pre-2017 

121st Mountain Motorized Infantry Brigade
122nd Mechanized Infantry Brigade
123th Mechanzied Infantry Division
15th Armored Brigade
Artillery Brigade
Air-Defense Brigade
Army Aviation Regiment
Boat Regiment
Chemical-Defense Regiment
Engineer Regiment

Post-2017 
31st Heavy Combined Arms Brigade
32nd Mountain Combined Arms Brigade
37th Light Combined Arms Brigade
42nd Light Combined Arms Brigade
122nd Medium Combined Arms Brigade
123rd Heavy Combined Arms Brigade
121st Air Assault Brigade
75th Special Operation Brigade
75th Artillery Brigade
75th Air-Defense Brigade
75th Engineer and Chemical-Defense Brigade
75th Sustainment Brigade

References

Further reading
Dennis J. Blasko. "PLA Ground Forces: Moving Toward a Smaller, More Rapidly Deployable, Modern Combined Arms Force" The People's Liberation Army as Organization: Reference Volume v1.0, James C. Mulvenon and Andrew N. D. Yang eds. (Santa Monico: RAND; 2002)

Field armies of the People's Liberation Army
Military units and formations disestablished in 2017
Military of Liuzhou
Guangzhou Military Region